Life Healthcare Group, formerly Afrox Healthcare, is the second largest private hospital operator in South Africa, with 6,500 beds. It is also the largest black-owned hospital operator in South Africa.

Afrox was traded on the JSE Securities Exchange until it was sold to Business Venture Investments Limited (Bidco), a black empowerment group, in 2005.

It bought Alliance Medical for about 10.4 billion rand, in November 2016.

References

Health care companies of South Africa
Hospital networks